Aldebert, or Adalbert, was a preacher in 8th century Gaul.

Aldebert may also refer to:

 Aldebert de Chambrun (1821–1899), French politician
 Aldebert de Chambrun (1872–1962), French general
 Henri Aldebert (1880–1961), French bobsledder
 Hildebert (c. 1055–1133), French bishop and theologian also known as Aldebert

See also
 Adelbert (disambiguation)